Joanie Greggains (1944–2022) was an American fitness instructor.

Greggains was the radio host of The Joanie Greggains Show, a weekend health and fitness program on KSRO Radio, Santa Rosa, California. She was also known for her long-running television exercise show, Morning Stretch.
She graduated from Abraham Lincoln High School in San Francisco in spring of 1961.

Career
Greggains was a former school and physical education teacher. Her first television appearances were during the exercise segments on "People Are Talking with Ann Fraser and Ross McGowan", a locally produced talk show based at KPIX-TV in San Francisco, in the late 1970s.  She continued to appear on the show until "Morning Stretch" made its television debut in 1978.  The show ran in broadcast TV syndication until 1995, moved to cable the following year, where it remained until 2000.

The show featured Greggains and her workout students in either a studio or outdoor environment (depending on weather conditions), with Greggains leading the exercises and bantering with crew members off-camera while working out.  The show's success caught the attention of Elaine Powers fitness control salons, which was looking to expand its reach and strengthen its image.  At the time, actress Suzanne Somers was at the height of her popularity and became well known for her health-conscious image.  Because of Greggains' close physical resemblance to Somers, and her engaging, upbeat workout style, Powers hired Greggains as the company's Fitness Programs Director.  Greggains' role was to develop workout regimens and travel the country to promote Elaine Powers fitness salons when not working on "Morning Stretch" or her other line of fitness videos.

She produced, choreographed and starred in 15 exercise videos, receiving two gold record awards, nine gold videocassette awards, and six platinum videocassette awards. Over 10 million copies of her exercise videos have been sold.

Greggains was a special advisor to the California Governor's Council on Physical Fitness and Sports. She was the founder of Fit Camps, which features the Fat Flush programs and taught exercise at her fitness center in Mill Valley, California.

Greggains resided in Northern California. She died on May 28, 2022.

Publications
Greggains, Joanie, Total Shape Up, New Amer Library Trade, 1985, 
Greggains, Joanie, Twelve Minutes to Super Stomachs, Metacom 1988, 
Greggains, Joanie, Ann Louise Gittleman, The Fat Flush Fitness Plan, Contemporary Books, 2006, 
Greggains, Joanie, Ann Louise Gittleman, The Fat Flush Plan, McGraw-Hill Publishing Co., 2003, 
Greggains, Joanie, Romanowski, Patricia, Fit Happens: strategies for living a healthier, happier, fitter life, Villard, 1999, 
Greggains, Joanie, White, Arthur, Back Health, Parade Video, 1990,

References

External links

Shaping Up: Elaine Powers diversifies to build stronger corporate body

Profile: Health and Fitness

Living people
American exercise and fitness writers
American exercise instructors
American health and wellness writers
American women non-fiction writers
Radio personalities from San Francisco
Writers from California
21st-century American women
1944 births